The Urgell Beatus, Beatus d'Urgell or Beatus la Seu d'Urgell is a 10th-century illuminated manuscript and medieval commentary. It is at Musei Diocesá de La Seu d'Urgell, at La Seu d'Urgell in Spain.

History
Around the year 786 the abbot of the monastery of San Martín de Liebana, Santander, known as Beatus wrote a commentary on Revelation. From the tenth century, this work, was made into many copies or print miniatures, which were spread by Beatus in monasteries and cathedrals throughout the Middle Ages. Among these twenty codices, called "Beatus", which are still scattered around the world, one of the most beautiful and complete examples is the Urgell Beatus.

It currently consists of seven pages numbered with Roman numerals and another 243 pages with Arabic numerals. It contains 79 illustrated miniatures. In the first third of the 20th century, it was studied by technicians as prestigious as HA Sanders, W Nieves and Mn.Pere Pujol, archivist of the Cathedral, all of which have tried to emphasize paleographic interest and artistic importance of the Codex and clarify any issues of bibliographic fact. Unlike other all existing Beatus, which are the appropriate authors' names, place of origin and the date of preparation, the Beatus we do not give any reference, making it virtually impossible to identify the calligraphers and miniaturist. Regarding the place and date much of the current specialists consider some coming from the monastery of La Rioja, towards the end of the 10th century.

Regarding the Urgell Beatus, there are 12 illustrations included in the pages that make up the prelims, there are 67 references in the Commentary of the Apocalypse, and more than 11 illustrate the Commentary of Daniel . Add thus a total of 90 illustrations drawn medallions are on Genealogy.

On 29 September 1996, two members of an organized gang of art thieves stole the Beatus after cutting the power and breaking the window of the museum. This group was caught in Valencia on 21 January 1997, among other works of art the police recovered the intact Beatus.

Cultural references
 Sample images including stamp issued in 1975 by Spain's postal service corresponding to Beatus 72nd miniature.

References

Illuminated beatus manuscripts
10th-century illuminated manuscripts
Spanish manuscripts